Phạm Thị Trân (926–976), was a Vietnamese artist, opera singer and Mandarin.

She was a pioneer artist as an opera singer and referred to as the first professional theatre artist in Vietnam. She is also counted as the first woman to have been made a Mandarin in Vietnam.

References 

926 births
976 deaths
10th-century Vietnamese women
Vietnamese singers
Medieval singers